"How Do I Live" is a song written by Diane Warren. It was performed by American singer, songwriter and actress Trisha Yearwood and was featured in the film Con Air. It was also performed by American singer and actress LeAnn Rimes and the extended version of the song was later featured on her second studio album, You Light Up My Life: Inspirational Songs (1997). Both versions were released to radio on May 23, 1997.

In the US, Rimes's version peaked at  2 for five non-consecutive weeks in late 1997 and early 1998. It set a record for staying on the Billboard Hot 100 chart for 69 weeks, a record it held until "I'm Yours" by Jason Mraz set a new record of 76 weeks. Rimes' recording also set the record for the most time in the Billboard Hot 100's top 5 at 25 consecutive weeks and held the record for 19 years (until it was broken in early 2017 by the Chainsmokers' song "Closer"), the record for Billboard Hot 100's top 10 at 32 consecutive weeks (a record surpassed by "Shape of You" by Ed Sheeran in 2017). It ranks at No. 6 on Billboard's All Time Top 100, the only single on the top 10 of this list not peaking at No. 1. It has been certified 3× Platinum by the RIAA for shipments of 3 million copies in the United States, the highest certified country single of that time, to be surpassed 12 years later by "Love Story" by Taylor Swift, which has been certified 8× Platinum.

Despite only peaking as high as No. 7 in the UK Singles Chart, Rimes' version of "How Do I Live" spent 34 weeks on the chart, ending up as the 6th best selling single of 1998. As of August 2014, the song has sold 710,000 copies in the UK.

"How Do I Live" was also covered by F.I.R. (Faye and Real featuring LeAnn Rimes).  F.I.R. invited Rimes to record a portion of the song for their third album Flight Tribe in 2006. At the end of the decade Billboard would rank "How Do I Live" as the 12th-most-successful song of the 1990s. In 2014, to commemorate the magazine's 120th anniversary, Billboard reformulated the top Hot 100 songs for each decade, and "How Do I Live" finished as the No. 1 song of the 1990s, despite never reaching the position on the weekly tally. In a retrospective compilation in conjunction with SiriusXM from 2019, Billboard ranked "How Do I Live" second on their list of top performing songs of the decade.

Background
Diane Warren wrote "How Do I Live" for consideration for the 1997 action blockbuster Con Air soundtrack. She ran into LeAnn Rimes at a restaurant shortly following her win as Best New Artist during the 1997 Grammy Awards. Warren told Rimes that she wrote the song specifically with Rimes in mind, promising it to her. After she recorded the song the next day, Walt Disney Pictures, the company behind the Touchstone Pictures label, decided that Rimes' recording had too much of a "pop" sound, and that Rimes, then 14 at the time of the recording, was too young to sing about the subject matter of the song and refused to release it. The company then turned to Trisha Yearwood for the re-recording, to which the latter agreed. According to Yearwood, she was unaware of Rimes' recording prior to being approached by Touchstone Pictures to record the song.

Yearwood's version, which utilized a more throaty, country-western vibe, appeared in the film. When Rimes' record label, Curb Records, heard of the release, they were reluctant to release Rimes' version until Warren personally called label founder Mike Curb and urged him to release Rimes' recording as a single; her version was then quickly released to mainstream pop radio on the same day as Yearwood's rendition. Neither Rimes' nor Yearwood's version of the song was included on the soundtrack album for the film (which consists of the score by Trevor Rabin and Mark Mancina).
Yearwood's version reached number two on the U.S. country singles chart and was internationally successful. It appeared on her first compilation album (Songbook) A Collection of Hits (1997). The album certified quadruple-platinum in the United States. 

Rimes' version was released on a CD and cassette tape single, with the original rendition of the song plus an extended version, the latter of which was later re-issued on Rimes' You Light Up My Life: Inspirational Songs, while the former was issued on her Greatest Hits in 2003 in the US, The Best of LeAnn Rimes in 2004 internationally and again in the US on her All-Time Greatest Hits album in 2015. The CD single was later re-issued with the original version of the song as the A-side track with the B-side being replaced by the Mr. Mig's Dance Radio Edit, which would later be featured on the remix edition of The Best of LeAnn Rimes in 2004, while in 2014 her Dance Like You Don't Give A...Greatest Hits Remixes featured a new remix by Cahill.

Critical reception

Rimes' version
Larry Flick from Billboard described the song as a "straight-ahead pop ballad" and noted that Rimes "has a field day with this beautiful, richly soulful Diane Warren composition, giving it a youthful exuberance and wide-eyed innocence that will melt even the coldest heart." He also added that Rimes "is so vigorously courting the pop world with this single" and that she "has offered a tune that makes the most of her formidable pipes and leaves listeners salivating for more." Alanna Nash from Entertainment Weekly called it a "lush version". In 2019, Stacker placed Rimes' version of the song at No. 1 in their list of "Best 90s pop songs", noting it as a "classic break-up tune". David Sinclair from The Times viewed it as a "sludgy ballad by the 14-year-old prodigy."

Yearwood's version
Regarding Yearwood's version, Flick stated that Yearwood "is a vocalist with the depth and intensity to convey the love and longing in the lyric." He added that the production by the singer with Tony Brown "is lush and textured, but it is her vocal that is this single's centerpiece. It's full of passion and subtle nuances." Alanna Nash from Entertainment Weekly described Yearwood's version as a "countrier rendition". She noted, "When Yearwood sings, ”If you ever leave/Baby, you would take away everything good in my life,” her voice throbs with adult emotion."

Track releases

Rimes' version

 US single
 "How Do I Live" – 4:25
 "How Do I Live" (original extended version) – 4:53

 US single re-release
 "How Do I Live" (film mix) – 4:25
 "How Do I Live" (Mr. Mig Dance Radio Edit) – 3:54

 US/UK maxi-single/US/UK digital download/vinyl
 "How Do I Live" (Mr. Mig Dance Radio Edit) – 3:54
 "How Do I Live" (Mr. Mig Club Radio Edit) – 4:15
 "How Do I Live" (RH Factor Radio Edit) – 3:45
 "How Do I Live" (Mr. Mig Club Mix) – 7:38
 "How Do I Live" (original extended version) – 4:53

 US promo Maxi-single
 "How Do I Live" (Mr. Mig Dance Radio Edit) – 3:54
 "How Do I Live" (Mr. Mig Club Radio Edit) – 4:15
 "How Do I Live" (RH Factor Radio Edit) – 3:45
 "How Do I Live" (RH Factor Club Vocal) – 9:11
 "How Do I Live" (Mr. Mig Club Mix) – 7:38

 UK single
 "How Do I Live" – 4:25
 "How Do I Live" (RH Factor Radio Edit) – 3:45

 UK maxi-CD
 "How Do I Live" – 4:25
 "You Light Up My Life" – 3:34
 "How Do I Live" (Mr. Mig Remix Club Radio Edit) – 4:15
 "How Do I Live" (RH Factor Radio Edit) – 3:45

 UK maxi CD #2/Australian CD single
 "Commitment" – 4:36
 "How Do I Live" (Mr. Mig Dance Radio Edit) – 3:54
 "How Do I Live" (Mr. Mig Club Radio Edit) – 4:15
 "How Do I Live" (RH Factor Radio Edit) – 3:45
 "How Do I Live" (Mr. Mig Club Mix) – 7:38
 "How Do I Live" (original extended version) – 4:53

 Germany maxi-CD
 "How Do I Live" (radio edit) – 3:45
 "How Do I Live" (original extended version) – 4:25
 "How Do I Live" (Mr. Mig Dance Radio Edit) – 3:54
 "How Do I Live" (Mr. Mig Club Radio Edit) – 4:15

Yearwood's version
 US/Japan CD-Single/US cassette tape
 "How Do I Live" – 4:28
 "How Do I Live" (video version) – 4:07

 European CD single
 "How Do I Live" (video version) – 4:07
 "How Do I Live" – 4:28
 "She's in Love with the Boy" – 4:05

Chart performance
Both the Rimes and the Yearwood versions debuted on the US Billboard Hot 100 on the week ending June 14, 1997.  Rimes' version was noted for its extreme longevity, spending a record-breaking 69 weeks on the chart, with 62 of those weeks being in the top 40, 32 weeks in the top ten and 25 in the top five, all records at the time. Such was the run in the top five for Rimes that, despite not peaking at No. 1 and instead spending five non-consecutive weeks at No. 2, it competed directly with two songs by R&B singer Usher, "You Make Me Wanna..." and "Nice & Slow", which were released seven months apart from each other. This unprecedented success ultimately led to Rimes' version becoming the highest-selling country single at the time. Additionally, Rimes' version performed well on other component charts, most notably spending 11 weeks atop the Adult Contemporary chart.

Despite this success, Trisha Yearwood's version was most successful on country radio. Although Yearwood's version was moving quickly up the pop charts, getting as high as No. 23, MCA refused to issue further copies of the single, afraid of cannibalizing album sales. As a result, the limited press run of 300,000 sold out quickly, and the single was off the Hot 100 after 12 weeks. However, on country radio it became much more commercially successful, climbing all the way to No. 2, where it peaked for one week, outpacing the peak of 43 set by the recording Rimes released.

Consequently, Yearwood's version was among the top 20 biggest country singles of 1997, while Rimes' version was the ninth and fifth best- charting singles on the pop charts for the years 1997 and 1998, respectively. Rimes' version was later ranked at No. 4 on Billboard'''s All Time Top 100 in 2008. It was later ranked by Billboard as the 12th-most-successful single of the 1990s at the end of the decade in 1999 and 15 years later, after retabulations, was re-ranked as the second best-charting single released during the decade, and the best-charting single of the 1990s proper.

Internationally, the singles also had varied success, with Rimes' version typically outperforming Yearwood's. In the UK, Rimes' version peaked at No. 7, spending 30 weeks on the UK Top 40 singles chart and ranking as the sixth-highest-selling single on the UK year-end chart for 1998, while Yearwood's version landed at No. 66. Rimes' version additionally charted across central Europe, reaching the top 5 in the Netherlands and Norway, the top 20 in Denmark, and the top 40 in Austria, Germany, and Switzerland. Conversely, in both Ireland and Australia as well as on the Canadian country charts, Yearwood's version managed to outpace Rimes' peak at Nos. 2, 3, and 1 to Rimes' 14, 17, and 60, respectively. Consequently, Yearwood's version was ranked in the top 20 and 30 for the 1997 Australian and Canadian country year-end charts, respectively.

Charts
Rimes version

Weekly charts

Year-end charts

Decade-end charts

Yearwood version

Weekly charts

Year-end charts

Certifications
Rimes version

Yearwood version

Release history
Rimes version

Yearwood version

Accolades
In 1998, for the first time in history, the Grammy Awards nominated two artists for the same song in the same category. Directly following Rimes' performance of the song, Yearwood won the Grammy Award for Best Female Country Vocal Performance.  Yearwood also performed the song at the Country Music Association for which she won the 1997 award for Female Vocalist of the Year. Yearwood also won the 1997 Academy of Country Music Award for Top Female Vocalist.

The song also was nominated for the Academy Award for Best Original Song, but lost to "My Heart Will Go On" from the film Titanic. Yearwood performed the song at the award ceremony. Ironically, the song received a contradictory nomination for the Golden Raspberry Award for Worst Original Song, but "lost" again to the soundtrack for The Postman.Credits and personnel
Diane Warren – songwriter

Rimes version
Credits for Rimes' version are adapted from the liner notes of the UK version of Sittin' on Top of the World.

Wilbur C. Rimes – producer
Chuck Howard – producer
Mike Curb – producer
Lesley Albert – production coordinator
Mary Ann Kennedy – background vocals
Pam Rose – background vocals
Michael Black – background vocals
Dennis Wilson – background vocals
Mick Guzauski – mixing engineer, mixing
Bob Campbell-Smith – mixing engineer, recording, mixing
Greg Morrow – drums
Michael Spriggs – acoustic guitar

John Willis – electric guitar
Michael Rhodes – bass
Steve Nathan – piano, keys
Paul Franklin – steel guitar
Jeff Watkins – assistant recording
Daniel Kresco – assistant recording, additional recording
Scott Ahaus – assistant recording, assistant mixing
Jim Rogers – assistant recording
David Boyer – assistant recording
Csaba Petocz – recording
David Hall – assistant recording

 In popular media 
The song was used in the 1997 movie Con Air.

Rimes' version was used on Days of Our Lives as the love theme for Mike Horton and Carrie Brady.

The song appears at the very end of King of the Hill’s Season 3, Episode 18.

Australian born Irish singer Johnny Logan covered the song on his 2001 album, Reach for Me.

The song is semi-frequently used in the webcomic Homestuck (albeit in the form of a cover) due to the character John Egbert's fascination with the movie Con Air'' and, in particular, the scene near the end of the movie during which the song is played.

References

External links
LeAnn Rimes – "How Do I Live" music video at official site
Trisha Yearwood – "How Do I Live" music video at CMT.com

1997 singles
1998 singles
LeAnn Rimes songs
Songs written by Diane Warren
Song recordings produced by Garth Fundis
Trisha Yearwood songs
Curb Records singles
MCA Nashville Records singles
Country ballads
Pop ballads
1990s ballads